Martha Bachem, née Marta Musilek (8 June 1924 – 29 May 2015) was an Austrian-German figure skater. She became a three-time German national champion before representing Austria at the 1948 Winter Olympics.

Life and career 
Musilek was born on 8 June 1924 in Vienna, Austria. She belonged to VK Engelmann Wien and Wiener EG. Karl Schäfer served as her coach.

Having become a German citizen due to the Anschluss of Austria, Musilek began her international career skating for Germany. She placed 9th at the 1939 European Championships in Davos, Switzerland, and 7th at the 1939 World Championships in Prague, Czechoslovakia.

Due to World War II, no ISU Championships  were held during the following years. Musilek competed at national events, winning German and Austrian titles. In 1944, she married Hans Erich Bachem from Cologne. She missed the 1946–1947 season, having recently given birth, but resumed skating the following season.

As Germany was barred from the 1948 Winter Olympics, she arranged for the Austrian Repatriation Commission in Munich to send her back to her birth country. Representing Austria, she placed 11th at the 1948 European Championships in Prague, Czechoslovakia; 9th at the Olympics in St. Moritz, Switzerland; and 7th at the 1948 World Championships in Davos, Switzerland.

Later in 1948, Austria expelled her to Germany because she had not fulfilled the requirements for Austrian repatriation, i.e. divorcing her German husband.

Competitive highlights

References 

1924 births
2015 deaths
Austrian female single skaters
Figure skaters at the 1948 Winter Olympics
German female single skaters
Olympic figure skaters of Austria
Figure skaters from Vienna